Emmanuel Mathias (born April 3, 1986) is a Togo international footballer, who is currently a free agent.

Career
In 2004, he transferred to Togolese top club topclub Étoile Filante de Lomé, and earned a Togolese passport. On 1 January 2007 was loaned out to El-Gawafel Sportives de Gafsa.

On 22 June 2009 Mathias signed for the Israeli soccer team Hapoel Petach Tikva. He was signed by Heartland F.C. in 2012.

On 9 July 2013 Mathias moved from Heartland Owerri to Mamelodi Sundowns in South Africa.
In 2014 mathias moved from Mamelodi Sundowns to MTN/FAZ Super Division 
team  ZESCO United F.C.

In July 2015, Mathias joined Platinum Stars F.C.

He joined Lusaka Dynamos in January 2017.

Position
He plays as a right defender or a defensive midfielder.

International career
On 27 March 2005 he debuted for the Togo national football team against Mali in the 2006 FIFA World Cup qualification. He was a member of the Togo team at the 2006 Africa Cup of Nations in Egypt.

References 

1986 births
Living people
Sportspeople from Kaduna
Naturalized citizens of Togo
Togolese people of Nigerian descent
Togolese footballers
Togo international footballers
Expatriate footballers in Togo
Togolese expatriate footballers
Expatriate footballers in Tunisia
Espérance Sportive de Tunis players
Expatriate footballers in Israel
Togolese expatriate sportspeople in Israel
Nigerian expatriates in Israel
Hapoel Petah Tikva F.C. players
Association football defenders
Nigerian expatriate sportspeople in Tunisia
Expatriate footballers in Nigeria
Togolese expatriate sportspeople in Tunisia
Étoile Filante du Togo players
Expatriate soccer players in South Africa
ZESCO United F.C. players
BCC Lions F.C. players
EGS Gafsa players
21st-century Togolese people